The 1984 KFK competitions in Ukraine were part of the 1984 Soviet KFK competitions that were conducted in the Soviet Union. It was 21st season of the KFK in Ukraine since its introduction in 1964.

First stage

Group 1

Group 2

Group 3

Group 4

Group 5

Group 6

Final

References

Ukrainian Football Amateur League seasons
1984 in Ukrainian football